is a Japanese manga artist. She is best known as a writer and illustrator of yuri manga, and as the creator of NTR: Netsuzou Trap and I Married My Best Friend To Shut My Parents Up.

Biography
Naoko made her debut as a manga artist in 2006, in the manga magazine  published by Takeshobo. In 2012, she would begin contributing works to the yuri manga magazine Comic Yuri Hime; her first serialized work, NTR: Netsuzou Trap, would be published in the magazine from 2014 to 2017, and was adapted into an anime series by Creators in Pack in 2017.

Works
 (2009, Takeshobo)
 (2010, Takeshobo)
 (2011, Takeshobo)
 (2011, Kodansha)
 (2012, Comic Yuri Hime)
 (2013, Comic Yuri Hime)
 (2014, Takeshobo)
 (2014, Comic Yuri Hime)
 (2014, Ichijinsha)
NTR: Netsuzou Trap (2014, Ichijinsha)
I Married My Best Friend To Shut My Parents Up (2018, Ichijinsha)
 (2019, Ichijinsha)

Anthologies
Yurihime Wildrose (Comic Yuri Hime)
Yurihime Wildrose Vol. 7
Yurihime Wildrose Vol. 8

References

External links
 

Japanese female comics artists
Female comics writers
Japanese women writers
Living people
Manga artists
Women manga artists
Year of birth missing (living people)